Scott Davis and David Pate were the defending champions, but lost in the first round to Glenn Michibata and Brad Pearce.

Javier Frana and Jim Pugh won the title by defeating Michibata and Pearce 7–5, 2–6, 6–4 in the final.

Seeds

Draw

Draw

References

External links
 Official results archive (ATP)
 Official results archive (ITF)

Los Angeles Open (tennis)
1991 ATP Tour
Volvo Tennis Los Angeles
Volvo Tennis Los Angeles